Percy Lawrance Wilson (March 3, 1899 – September 7, 1979), nicknamed "Pete", was an American Negro league first baseman in the 1920s.

A native of New Orleans, Louisiana, Wilson attended Leland College. He made his Negro leagues debut in 1923 with the Milwaukee Bears in 1923, and played for the Baltimore Black Sox in 1924. Wilson died in New Orleans in 1979 at age 80.

References

External links
 and Seamheads

1899 births
1979 deaths
Baltimore Black Sox players
Milwaukee Bears players
20th-century African-American sportspeople
Baseball infielders